Isophrictis invisella is a moth of the family Gelechiidae. It was described by Alexandre Constant in 1885. It is found on Corsica, Sardinia and Sicily.

The wingspan is about 10 mm. The fore- and hindwings are grey.

References

Moths described in 1885
Isophrictis